Winter of Discontent (translit. ) is a 2012 Egyptian drama film directed by Ibrahim El Batout. The film was selected as the Egyptian entry for the Best Foreign Language Film at the 86th Academy Awards, but it was not nominated.

Cast
 Salah Hanafy
 Moataz Mosallam as Moataz
 Amr Waked
 Farah Youssef

See also
 List of submissions to the 86th Academy Awards for Best Foreign Language Film
 List of Egyptian submissions for the Academy Award for Best Foreign Language Film

References

External links
 

2012 films
2012 drama films
2010s Arabic-language films
Egyptian drama films